László Gula (born 7 May 1944) is a Hungarian boxer. He competed in the men's lightweight event at the 1968 Summer Olympics.

References

1944 births
Living people
Hungarian male boxers
Olympic boxers of Hungary
Boxers at the 1968 Summer Olympics
Boxers from Budapest
Lightweight boxers
20th-century Hungarian people